Andrea Fraile Mas (born 2 January 1993) is a Spanish professional racing cyclist, who last rode for the UCI Women's Team  during the 2019 women's road cycling season.

References

External links

1993 births
Living people
Spanish female cyclists
Place of birth missing (living people)